Torta de nata is a traditional Colombian cuisine dessert. It is a cake made with natas, a type of cooked milk, which gives the cake a thick and creamy texture. It can be topped with various fruit toppings or creams.

See also
Pastel de nata - A different dessert with a similar name
Tres leches cake - Another dairy-soaked cake

References

Colombian cuisine
Cakes
Milk dishes